Baitoa is a municipality in the Santiago Province of the Dominican Republic. Santiago is part of the northern valley of the country, otherwise known as the Cibao. Baitoa is named after a native tree, also known as St. Domingo Boxwood. Baitoa was formerly known as Sabana de los Burros. The population speaks a Cibao dialect of Dominican Spanish.

Baitoa is located near the Yaque del Norte River, the longest river in the Dominican Republic. It sits east of Sabana Iglesia, west of La Vega Province, north of La Presa de Taveras, and south of the city of Santiago de los Caballeros.

History 

Baitoa was previously settled by indigenous peoples of the Caribbean known as Taínos for hundreds if not thousands of years prior to the arrival of Christopher Columbus in Hispaniola in 1492. At the time, the island was ruled by five Chiefdoms of Hispaniola, each of which was led by a cacique or a high chief. Baitoa was within the territorial bounds of the Chiefdom of Maguá, which was led by the cacique Guarionex. The early Spanish colonial history of Baitoa is largely unknown. There is no evidence to suggest that there were any permanent European settlements in this region during the early colonial period. However, the Spanish Conquistadors did establish a nearby fort and settlement in La Vega, Dominican Republic in 1494, in order to mine gold.

By the mid-1700s, perhaps the 1760s, Baitoa was settled by Francisco Espaillat y Virol (1734–1807), a Frenchman, physician, and slaveholder who established sugar plantations, tobacco fields, and cattle ranches in the region. He was the son of Jean Espaillat and Marguerite Virol, and was married to María Petronila Velilla Sanchez. In all likelihood, several families arrived in Baitoa around the same time during the mid to late-18th century. However, due to the lack of historical records from this period, this may never be known. As a rancher, Francisco Espaillat likely engaged in the livestock trade. He was also involved in the lucrative tobacco industry. Throughout the 18th-19th centuries, farmers from the Cibao formed semi-autonomous agricultural economies, and became increasingly involved in growing and selling tobacco to the international market, especially to Hamburg, Germany. One of Francisco's sons, Dr. Santiago Espaillat, became President-elect of the Dominican Republic in 1849, while a grandson, Ulises Francisco Espaillat, later went on to become the 15th President of the Dominican Republic in 1876.

In the early-1800s, migration to Baitoa was probably stimulated by the Peace of Basel (1795), whereby Spain had ceded Santo Domingo to France, and by the Haitian Revolution (1791–1804), where thousands of Dominicans left the island or moved to rural communities in order to escape the reach of colonial powers and foreign rule. By the late-1800s, more families began migrating to Baitoa from other areas of the Dominican Republic, due to the growing agricultural economy and availability of land in the region. There are parish records that go as far back as 1863 in Santiago de los Caballeros, which affirms the presence of several growing and newly arriving families in Baitoa. For much of the 19th-20th century, Baitoa was scarcely populated, with no more than several thousand people, and with a small number of core families who continued to form bonds and marital relationships with members of the same community.

Several other natives of Baitoa were also connected to well-known figures in Dominican history. For instance, Leonor Emilia Valerio (1890–1983), was a granddaughter of Dominican General Fernando Valerio. Mrs. Valerio was also married to Jose Ramon "Moncito" Fernandez (1896–1956), who was one of the leading entrepreneurs in Baitoa. The Parque Municipal Ramon Fernandez (Municipal Park) was posthumously named after him.

By the 21st century, Baitoa had a population of over 17,000 people.

Genealogy

Traditional Genealogy 
As per oral history, one of the "founding fathers" of Baitoa was Julian Perez (h. 1780-), the son of Manuel Perez. His mother's name is unknown. Julian Perez was married to Baltazara Núñez Fernández in the 1820s.

Julian and Baltazara had the following children:

 Jose "Pepe" Perez
 Francisco de los Santos "Pancho" Perez
 Juana Francisca Perez
 Ramon Perez
 Antonio Perez

Julian Perez also had at least one sister named Beatriz Perez, who was married to Clemente Perez.

Some of the first postcolonial families of Baitoa include the Espaillat, Perez, Genao, Pineda, Fernández, Valerio, Núñez, and Franco families. Most of the original families of Baitoa came from surrounding regions in Santiago province, although some were of European origins. The Espaillat came from France, the Perez and Genao came from nearby López and Angostura (which was later incorporated into Baitoa), the Pineda came from San Cristobal, the Fernández came from Puñal, the Valerio came from La Zanja, and finally, the Núñez and Franco came from Arroyo Hondo.

Genetic Genealogy 
Similar to the multiethnic profiles of many other Dominicans, natives of Baitoa present with a mixture of European, African, and Native American DNA based on genetic genealogical evidence, although their ethnic background is strongly biased toward Western European origins. This fits the general ancestral pattern in the Cibao valley region of the Dominican Republic, which is characterized by high percentages of Spanish ancestry, followed by West African ancestry and then Native American ancestry. These observations are based on DNA testing results from the genealogical testing site, 23andMe.

Education 

In the late-19th century, the first public school of Baitoa, Liceo Prof. Gabriel Franco, was founded and named after Prof. Gabriel Franco Núñez (c. 1863–1943). The school is located near Carretera Santiago Baitoa, the main highway traversing the region. Franco was one of the first educators in the region of Baitoa. He was known as a school teacher, pianist, and bibliophile. He was the son of Justo Franco Diaz and Maria Francisca Núñez Fernández, who were originally from Arroyo Hondo, Santiago. The Franco family had previously lived in Arroyo Hondo for generations. His father, Justo Franco (c. 1829–1875), was the son of Ramon Franco and Maria de la Paz Diaz (c. 1793–1871). Ramon Franco was allegedly the natural son of Luisa Núñez.

Gabriel Franco later migrated from Arroyo Hondo to Baitoa around 1881. He then married Reina Julia Perez (c. 1862–1953) in 1883. They had the following children together: Ernestina (1884–1962), Erminda (1887–1970), Gabriel Eugenio (1889–1949), Agripina del Carmen (1891–1977), Maria Cristina (1893–1941), Maria Otilia (1896–?), Herminio (1898–1933), Julia Antonia (1900–1993), and Laura Otilia Franco Perez (1902–1986). Gabriel Franco also had a premarital child with Amelia Tejada, named Pedro Agapito Franco Tejada (1881–1966). Gabriel home-schooled all of his children. His daughter, Agripina, later became a teacher in her own right. His son, Gabriel Eugenio, was a small business owner in Baitoa, and his other son, Herminio, was a journalist.

Liceo Prof. Gabriel Franco is still an active school.

Health 
The main hospital of Baitoa is Hospital Municipal Antonio Fernández, incorporated on September 28, 2012. This hospital is named after the father of former Dominican President, Leonel Fernández.

Politics 
In 1993, Baitoa, formerly a section of Santiago, was officially elevated to the rank of Municipal District. In 2014, Baitoa was elevated once again and recognized as a Municipality of Santiago. The Ayuntamiento Municipal de Baitoa, or The Mayor's Office, is located on calle África Núñez. This street is named after former Baitoa school teacher, Prof. África Núñez Pineda (1911–2006).
The current mayor or alcalde of Baitoa is Bernardo Ernesto López Rodriguez (2016–2024), following Rádhames Rojas (2010–2016), and Jose Rafael Peña, among others.

On June 28, 2017, the Mayor of Baitoa, Bernardo López, organized a protest in front of the national palace, demanding a clean water supply system for his constituents.

Culture 

The local population of Baitoa are predominantly Roman Catholic. One of the local churches is Iglesia San Ramon Nonato (Saint Ramon Catholic Church). The church is named after Raymond Nonnatus, the patron saint of Baitoa. The Catholic Church in Latin America plays a very important role in the culture and identity of Dominicans, especially natives of Baitoa, who come from traditional, rural families. Many local festivals and community activities revolve around church traditions and teachings. Prior to the opening of Iglesia San Ramon in the early 20th-century, people from Baitoa would often receive visits from parish priests from the Santiago Apostol Cathedral, located about 25 km away.

The people of Baitoa are known to celebrate El Día de los Burros (or Donkey Day), where all the cowboys in town ride in their horses, donkeys, and mules, within the community, as a well to celebrate their animals and country culture. This event is a local spin off the religious holiday, El Día de San Juan (or the Day of Saint John).

The most popular style of music in this region is merengue music, which is played with instruments like the accordion, güira and tambora. Baseball is the most popular sport in Baitoa and the Dominican Republic in general.

Some of the most well-known landmarks in this region include La Loma de Juana Núñez, La Presa de Taveras, El Callejón de los Sánchez, and the sports complex known as Centro Deportivo Sergio Perez, posthumously named after Sergio Antonio Perez (1949–1992).

Notable people from Baitoa 
Manny Pérez – actor, screenwriter

According to the Dominican Bar Association in 2017 "Hon. Diccia Pineda-Kirwan New York State Supreme Court, Queens County Justice Diccia T. Pineda-Kirwan has been sitting in the New York State Supreme Court, Queens County, since January 2010. Prior to her election to the Supreme Court, she served as a judge in the Civil Court of the City of New York, Queens County, since January 2003. She is the first Latina elected to the bench and to public office in the history of Queens County, as well as the first female Dominican-born judge to be elected in the state of New York. Prior to serving as a judge, Justice Pineda-Kirwan worked in the judicial branch for more than 13 years. Born in Baitoa, Santiago in the Dominican Republic as one of seven children, Justice Pineda-Kirwan was nine years old when she moved to New York to join her family, who had previously emigrated there. She and her family settled in Hollis, Queens, where she then attended public schools. After graduating from Jamaica High School, Justice Pineda-Kirwan went on to attend Queens College, even though her family had already returned to the Dominican Republic. She graduated cum laude while double majoring in Spanish and Secondary Education with a minor in French and Theatre/Dance".

Judge Diccia Pineda-Kirwan has filled the Baitoa community, and The Dominican Republic with pride. She is a woman who has successfully managed to maintain a balance between the profession and the family. She has served on the advisory boards of the Latin American Cultural Center of Queens, the Embassy of Latin American Women of Queens, the Asociacion Benefica Cultural Father Billini, the Latin American Women's Council, and the Latino Lawyers Association. Her other memberships have included the National Association of Women Judges, the National Hispanic Bar Association, the Association of Judges of Hispanic Heritage, the Association of Dominican Judges, the Catholic Lawyers Guild, the Dominican Bar Association, and The Judicial Friends.

Additional Images

Sources 
 – World-Gazetteer.com

References 

Populated places in Santiago Province (Dominican Republic)
Municipalities of the Dominican Republic